These are the squads for the countries that played in the 1921 South American Championship. The participating countries were Argentina, Brazil, Chile and Uruguay. The teams plays in a single round-robin tournament, earning two points for a win, one point for a draw, and zero points for a loss.

Argentina
Head Coach: n/i

Brazil
Head coach:  Ferreira Vianna Netto

Paraguay
Head Coach:  José Durand Laguna

Uruguay
Head Coach:  Ernesto Fígoli

Notes

References 

Squads

Copa América squads